The Northrup House in Iola, Kansas is a historic Queen Anne-style house built in about 1895.  It was listed on the National Register of Historic Places in 1997.

It was originally built as a one-and-a-half-story Queen Anne cottage in 1895 and has been added onto since then.  It is now a two-and-one-half-story frame building upon a rusticated limestone and concrete block foundation.

A second contributing building is included in the listing:  a single-story, gable-roofed concrete block garage.

References

External links

Houses on the National Register of Historic Places in Kansas
Queen Anne architecture in Kansas
Houses completed in 1895
Allen County, Kansas